The 2014 Breeders' Cup Challenge series provided winners of the designated races an automatic "Win and You're In" Berth in the 2014 Breeders' Cup. Races were chosen by the Breeders' Cup organization and included key prep races in the various Breeders' Cup divisions from around the world.

For 2014, seven new races were added to the series: the Paddock Stakes, Queen Elizabeth Stakes, Grande Premio Brasil, Clasico Cesar del Rio, Copa De Oro Vinas De Chile, The Gold Cup at Santa Anita, Haskell Invitational, Belmont Oaks, Matron Stakes, Juddmonte International and Rockfel Stakes. NBC broadcast 18 of the races.

For 2014, thirty-seven horses entered in the Breeders' Cup races qualified via the challenge series, including four of the winners. These were:
 Bayern, who qualified for the Classic by winning the Haskell Invitational
 Main Sequence, who won the Joe Hirsch Turf Classic to qualify for the Turf
 Work All Week, who earned his berth in the Sprint by winning the Phoenix Stakes
 Goldencents, who won the Pat O'Brien Handicap to qualify for the Dirt Mile

The 2014 Breeders' Cup races were missing several prominent horses due to injury or illness. Most notably, American Pharoah, favored in the Juvenile after winning the FrontRunner Stakes, missed the race due to a bruise to the left front hoof. Similarly, Wise Dan, two-time winner of the Mile, qualified for the third time by winning the Shadwell Turf Mile but suffered a non-displaced fracture in his right foreleg. Beholder qualified in the Zenyatta but came down with an illness and missed the chance to defend her Distaff championship. Bal a Bali qualified for the Turf in the Gran Premio Brazil but developed laminitis and missed the race.

The winners of the 2014 Breeders' Cup Challenge series races are shown below. The last column shows whether the horse was subsequently entered in the Breeders' Cup, and if so, whether they achieved a top three finish. The 2014 Breeders' Cup Challenge races included:

References

Breeders' Cup Challenge
Breeders' Cup Challenge series
Breeders' Cup